Fedoriv, female form Fedoriva is a Ukrainian surname, related to the name Fyodor. Notable people with this surname include:

 Aleksandra Fedoriva (born 1988), Russian track and field athlete 
 Andrey Fedoriv (born 1963), Soviet sprinter
 Vitaliy Fedoriv (born 1987), Ukrainian football defender
 Vitaliy Fedoriv (born 1977), Ukrainian civil servant and politician
 Volodymyr Fedoriv (born 1985), Ukrainian football defender

See also
 Fedorov